Louise Blais (born July 1, 1966) worked as a Canadian diplomat for 25 years. After serving in various capacities in the Canadian government, she was named as Ambassador and Deputy Permanent Representative to the United Nations in August 21, 2017, with special responsibility for Agenda 2030 and development. 

In 2022, Blais was named to The Hill Times' list of top 50 people influencing Canada's foreign policy. She was also named a senior adviser with the Business Council of Canada in 2022.

From May 2021 to December 2021 she returned to serve as Consulate General of Canada to the US Southeast, after having served in the same position from 2014-2017, prior to being named as Ambassador. On January 8, 2019 she was appointed to the Executive Board of UNICEF for the period spanning 2019.   

She was the director of the Canadian Cultural Centre in Paris from 2007 to 2011 and later served as Minister-Counsellor at the embassy. She was previously a Counsellor in Tokyo and Washington D.C. 

Blais is a graduate of McGill University.

References

External links 
 

1966 births
Canadian women ambassadors
Living people
McGill University alumni
People from Quebec City
Permanent Representatives of Canada to the United Nations
Consuls